Taxandria angustifolia is a species of tree that grows on the south coast of Western Australia. This plant was previously classified as Agonis angustifolia but is now part of the Taxandria genus.

It blooms between June and July producing white flowers.

convex below. The sepals are usually glabrous or some with sparse hairs.

Often found in swamps, along creeks in verges it has a limited distribution, confined to a small area in the Great Southern region centred around Albany extending from West Cape Howe to Cheyne Beach to where it grows in sandy or loam soils around granite.

First formally described by the botanist Johannes Conrad Schauer in 1844 as part of  Johann Georg Christian Lehmann's work Plantae Preissianae The plant was subsequently reclassified to T. angustifolia in a 2007 revision by Wheeler and Marchant into the new genus Taxandria.

References

angustifolia
Myrtales of Australia
Rosids of Western Australia
Trees of Australia
Trees of Mediterranean climate
Plants described in 1844